Bullet Proof Diva's is the second studio album by Hexedene, released on August 15, 2001, by Matrix Cube.

Track listing

Personnel
Adapted from the Bullet Proof Diva's liner notes.

Hexedene
 Jonathan Sharp – programming, guitar

Additional musicians
 Alexys B – lead vocals (1, 6, 8, 12)
 Daemon Cadman – lead vocals (3, 7)
 Terri Kennedy – lead vocals (4, 9)
 Katie Helsby – lead vocals (3, 10, 11)
 Sarahjane – lead vocals (2)Production and design'''
 Loretta Sterling – production

Release history

References

External links 
 Bullet Proof Diva's at Discogs (list of releases)

2001 albums
Hexedene albums